Macdougal, foaled 1953, was a New Zealand thoroughbred racehorse.

In November 1959 he won the Melbourne Cup at Flemington Racecourse. He was ridden by Pat Glennon and carried a weight of 8-11 (123 pounds). Macdougal started at odds of 8/1 in a field of 28 runners and won the cup by three lengths.

Reference list

See also
 List of Melbourne Cup winners

1953 racehorse births
Racehorses bred in New Zealand
Racehorses trained in New Zealand
Racehorses trained in Australia
Melbourne Cup winners
Thoroughbred family 25